Homecoming: The Bluegrass Album is the eleventh studio album and first bluegrass album by American country music singer Joe Diffie, released on October 25, 2010 through Rounder Records. It was Diffie’s final solo album released during his lifetime.

Critical reception
AllMusic reviewer j. poet gave the album three-and-a-half stars out of five, saying that "there's not a weak track here".

Track listing

Personnel
 Harley Allen - background vocals
 Mike Compton - mandolin
 Charlie Cushman - banjo
 Joe Diffie - lead vocals, background vocals
 Mark Fain - upright bass
 Aubrey Haynie - fiddle
 Rob Ickes - Dobro
 Sonya Isaacs - background vocals
 Carl Jackson - background vocals
 Alecia Nugent - background vocals
 Michael L. Rogers - background vocals
 James B. Stewart - background vocals
 Monica Stiles - background vocals
 Bryan Sutton - acoustic guitar
 Rhonda Vincent - background vocals
 Bradley Walker - background vocals

Chart performance

References

2010 albums
Joe Diffie albums
Rounder Records albums